Nevogilde is a civil parish in the municipality of Lousada, Portugal. The population in 2011 was 2,617, in an area of 3.44 km².

References

Freguesias of Lousada